Aristide Frémine (1837 – 5 December 1897) was a French writer.

He was a native of Bricquebec, in the département of Manche and is often associated with his brother, the writer Charles Frémine, born in 1841.  He is the author of an epic verse, Legend of Normandy (Légende de Normandie), a romance called A Young Lady from the Countryside (Une Demoiselle de Campagne) (1892) and of a study called The French in the Channel Islands (Les Français dans les Îles de la Manche).  He was also a serial contributor to the daily Le Figaro between 1884 and 1888.  He died in Issy-les-Moulineaux, Seine-Saint-Denis.

References
The French Wikipedia stub this article was translated from on January 26, 2006

External links
 

French poets
1837 births
1897 deaths
19th-century French journalists
French male journalists
French male poets
19th-century poets
19th-century French male writers